Flag carrier Garuda Indonesia had its inaugural flight on 26 January 1946, from Calcutta to Rangoon, using a Douglas DC-3 with the tail number RI 001, named Seluwah. It operated as Indonesian Airways. President Sukarno changed the name to Garuda Indonesia Airways in November 1946, later Garuda Indonesia.

The golden age of the airline started in 1956, when it operated Hajj flights using its eight Convair CV-240s. In 1963, it operated flights to Tokyo via Hong Kong using three Lockheed L-188 Electra. In 1965, Garuda expanded its destinations, with flights to Cambodia, China, Paris, Athens, and Prague. It also opened routes to Amsterdam from Jakarta, with stopovers in Bangkok, Mumbai, Karachi, Cairo, Rome, and Frankfurt. Australian routes were also introduced. Upon former CEO Reyn Altin Johannes Lumenta's request, Garuda dilated its route map, with services to Los Angeles via Honolulu in 1990, operated using the McDonnell Douglas MD-11.

The airline's fall began with two crashes in 1996 and 1997. The 1997 Asian financial crisis caused Garuda to abruptly terminate its intercontinental services, though Amsterdam, Frankfurt, and London services were continued until 28 October 2004. The September 11 attacks, 2002 Bali bombings, 2004 Indian Ocean earthquake and tsunami, and SARS outbreak further contributed to the fall of the airline. It climaxed in 2007, when the crash of Flight 200 prompted the European Union (EU) to ban Indonesian airlines in its airspace.

After the EU lifted its ban in July 2009, Garuda began an aggressive five-year expansion plan known as the Quantum Leap, involving an image overhaul. Using the Boeing 777-300ER Garuda reopened flights to London via Amsterdam. However, after years of success thanks to the Leap, Ari Askhara taking over the CEO position made the airline inconsistent in destinations; his leadership has drawn criticism.

List

References 

Destinations
Lists of airline destinations
SkyTeam destinations